Rahwan is a village in Harchandpur block of Rae Bareli district, Uttar Pradesh, India. As of 2011, its population was 4,292, in 802 households. It has 3 primary schools and one medical clinic.

The 1961 census recorded Rahwan as comprising 10 hamlets, with a total population of 1,865 people (970 male and 895 female), in 381 households and 346 physical houses. The area of the village was given as 1,453 acres and it had a post office at that point.

The 1981 census recorded Rahwan as having a population of 2,518 people, in 419 households, and having an area of 588.03 hectares.

References

Villages in Raebareli district